USS Underwriter is a name used more than once by the U.S. Navy:

 , a steamer purchased by the Navy on 23 August 1861.
 , a tugboat that served during World War I.

United States Navy ship names